Signal transducer CD24 also known as cluster of differentiation 24 or heat stable antigen CD24 (HSA) is a protein that in humans is encoded by the CD24 gene. CD24 is a cell adhesion molecule.

Function 

CD24 is a sialoglycoprotein expressed at the surface of most B lymphocytes and differentiating neuroblasts. It is also expressed on neutrophils and neutrophil precursors from the myelocyte stage onwards. The encoded protein is anchored via a glycosyl phosphatidylinositol (GPI) link to the cell surface. The protein also contributes to a wide range of downstream signaling networks and is crucial for neural development. Cross-linking of CD24 on the surface of neutrophils induces apoptosis, and this appears to be defective in sepsis. CD24 gene is found on chromosome 6 (6q21) An alignment of this gene's sequence finds genomic locations with similarity on chromosomes 1p36, 3p26, 15q21.3, 20q11.2 and Yq11.222. Whether transcription, and corresponding translation, occurs at each of these other genomic locations needs to be experimentally determined.

References

Further reading

External links 
 
 Mouse CD Antigen Chart
 Human CD Antigen Chart
 www.copewithcytokines.de: description of CD24 expression